Big Dog Motorcycles is a manufacturer of semi-custom, mid-priced motorcycles, based in Wichita, Kansas, United States.  The company was founded in 1994, shut down in 2011,  and recently reopened as Big Dog Is Back .

History
The company was founded in 1995 by Sheldon Coleman Jr., whose father was Sheldon Coleman Sr., who had been president of Coleman Company. In 1994, Coleman started working in his garage to modify Harley-Davidson motorcycles. Big Dog produced a single motorcycle in its first year, affectionately known as "Old Smokey"; its oversized fenders and classic cruiser style would point the way for all of the company's later products. When the company was started, it initially produced its motorcycles largely from Harley-Davidson parts. By 1996, Big Dog had sold 100 motorcycles. By 1997, the company had reached $2 million in sales, and in 2000, the company had expanded so much that a move to a new,  factory and world headquarters (since expanded to 175,000 square feet) was required. The company reached the peak of its success in 2005 at which it had made over 5,000 motorcycles, employed over 300 people, and brought in a revenue of over $120million. According to The Dallas Morning News, that year, it and American IronHorse were "the two largest builders of manufactured exotics". In 2006, Big Dog manufactured its 20,000th motorcycle. In 2007, it laid off people for the initial time upon not selling the expected number of motorcycles.

In April 2011, Big Dog shut down.  In October 2013,  Bank filed for foreclosure on Big Dog property.

Products
Big Dog produced ten models; the K-9, the Ridgeback, the "Chopper", the "Husky", the "Boxer", the Mastiff, the Pitbull, the Coyote, the Wolf  and their most recent addition, the BullDog.  The Pitbull model received V-Twin Expo's 2007 "Excellence In Motorcycling Award" for a production motorcycle.  All of their current motorcycles utilize S&S V-twin engines, 6-speed transmission, one-piece fuel tank, wide rear tires, and extensive use of chromed and billet aluminum components.  All of these models could be described as cruiser or chopper style motorcycles.  Major differences between the models include rear tire width (250mm versus 300mm), front tube length, and rear suspension.

Big Dog Motorcycles were particularly well known for their wide assortment of customizing options for their otherwise stock motorcycles.  These include at least 69 paint and graphic options, and a wide selection of accessories, including custom seats, exhausts, grips, storage bags, sissy bars and windshields.

References

External links
 New Big Dog website
 Official Big Dog Youtube

Motorcycle manufacturers of the United States
Manufacturing companies based in Kansas
Companies based in Wichita, Kansas
Vehicle manufacturing companies established in 1994
American companies established in 1994